1992 is the ninth studio album by American rapper the Game. It was released on October 14, 2016, by Blood Money Entertainment and eOne Music. The album features two guest appearances by R&B singer Jeremih and by Jason Derulo, as well as uncredited appearances by Osbe Chill, Lorine Chia and Sonyae Elise.

Background
Two months after releasing his previous double album The Documentary 2 and The Documentary 2.5 respectively, the Game took to Instagram to announce his next project entitled "1992". Without saying too much about the album, he did reveal the album will have no guest appearances and the project will be executive produced by Nigerian producer and frequent collaborator Bongo. The album's artwork was designed by Joe Cool, famed artist who is most famous for designing the cover of Snoop Dogg's famed album Doggystyle, along with Justin Roach.

Recording and production
Explaining the album concept in an interview, the Game said it's based on his personal experiences growing up in Compton, California including the LA Riots, O. J. Simpson's murder trial and the Dream Team. Hip-hop artist Nas coached the Game in this aspect by speaking daily, listening to and sending back and forth tracks from the album. Long time collaborator and record producer Bongo  is also described as having helped complete the album and providing production for the project. Talking about the album, Bongo describes it as having the approach of Golden age hip-hop in a way younger audiences can relate to and enjoy it.

Release and promotion
On June 20, 2016, the lead single "All Eyez" produced by Scott Storch and featuring American singer Jeremih was released. The song was sent to rhythmic contemporary radio on July 12, 2016 and has since peaked at number 79 on US Billboard Hot 100 chart. The music video was shot in Malibu by director Benny Boom. The video stars the Game himself as well as Jamaican Canadian recording artist / model Kreesha Turner with appearances by Jeremih and Scott Storch. It premiered on August 16, 2016 on Vevo.

Upon completion of the album, the Game embarked on his 1992: Block Wars Tour in an effort to promote the album. The tour running from August 26, 2016 until October 6, 2016 involved an array of shows in various cities across the US. The European stretch of the tour is due to take place in the following winter. On September 15, 2016, the album became available to pre-order on iTunes. Along with this, the track list consisting of 13 songs was revealed and the song "True Colors / It's On" became available as an instant download with a pre-order. The song features production from Bongo and vocals from underground Los Angeles rap artist Osbe Chill.

A week later while performing at a Miami beach nightclub, the Game publicly threatened Philadelphia rapper Meek Mill on-stage. The following day, the song "92 Bars" premiered on Power 105.1. The song contained numerous lyrics aimed at Meek Mill including comments about Meek's relationship with Nicki Minaj and his feud with rap superstar Drake. This prompted Meek to respond to Game on a remix of Young M.A.'s song, "Ooouuu" with appearances by fellow rappers Omelly and Beanie Sigel. The song was released on September 18, 2016. Following this, the Game made his own remix of the same song titled "Pest Control". Taking shots not only at Meek, but affiliates Omelly, Beanie Sigel and Sean Kingston for their involvement in the beef, the song was released two days after Meek's remix on September 20, 2016. A music video for "Pest Control" was shot in Brooklyn and Baltimore. The video premiered on Worldstar Hip-Hop on September 27, 2016.

"Baby You" became available as an instant download with a pre-order starting September 30, 2016. The song features vocals from American singer Jason Derulo, while production was handled by Miami-based production duo and long time collaborator Cool & Dre.

Commercial performance
1992 debuted at number four on the US Billboard 200 with 32,000 album-equivalent units, which included 25,000 pure album sales, marking the second highest debut of the week and the second best-selling album of the week. It serves as the Game's ninth top-ten album in the United States. 1992 marking the Game's eighth number one-album on the Top R&B/Hip-Hop Albums chart, tie Tupac Shakur and Lil Wayne for the third most number-one, among Hip Hop acts on that chart. The album is the Game's sixth album to entry on the US Top R&B/Hip Hop Albums in 2016, more than any other act. The album also became the Game's eighth solo album in a row to top the Top Rap Albums chart, extending his record for the most number-one albums by a solo act in the chart. 1992 is the third album by Game to debut at number-one on the US Independent Albums in one year. In the United Kingdom, the album debuted at number 38 on the UK Albums Chart, it serves as the Game's ninth UK top 40 album. 1992 is Game's third number-one album on the UK R&B Chart.

Critical reception 

1992 received generally positive reviews from most music critics.

Track listing

Notes
"True Colors / It's On" features vocals from rapper Osbe Chill.
"The Juice" and "The Soundtrack" features vocals from singer Lorine Chia.
"Young Niggas" features vocals from singer Sonyae Elise.
"Baby You" features vocals from singer Jason Derulo.

Charts

Weekly charts

Year-end charts

See also
 2016 in hip hop music
 List of UK R&B Albums Chart number ones of 2016
 List of Billboard number-one R&B/hip-hop albums of 2016

References

2016 albums
The Game (rapper) albums
Albums produced by Scott Storch